Fluid Ounces (often referred to as Fl. Oz.) were a piano-based, power pop band from Murfreesboro, Tennessee that garnered a cult following for their critically acclaimed records, which featured a distinctive blend of hooks, varied musical styles, clever wordplay, and intricate, complex arrangements.

Inception
Seth Timbs had been writing his own songs on both guitar and piano for years. By the time he had formed Seth Timbs & The Mad Hatters, he had already accumulated a rather large back catalog. After the Mad Hatters, Timbs played in the band Ella Minopy with his good friend Matt Mahaffey. Once Ella broke up, Timbs joined with Ella’s bassist, Ben Morton, along with Elijah Shaw and local music legend/drummer Sam Baker (of local bands like the F Particles, These Are Houseplants, Blind Farmers, and Speake, among others) to form a new band. Timbs' long-time collaborator/friend, Brian “Tha B” Rogers, briefly joined Self, the new band with Ella’s drummer Matt Mahaffey, but ultimately decided to work on Timbs' new project.

The new band called itself Fl. Oz. (going by “Fluid Ounces” would come later when people didn’t understand the band name in its abbreviated form) and began playing and recording in 1996 in Murfreesboro and Nashville, TN on the newly formed Spongebath Records.

Sound
Their sound was catchy piano pop, influenced by the likes of Elton John, Harry Nilsson, The Beatles, Elvis Costello, Ray Charles, They Might Be Giants, XTC, Randy Newman, and Thelonious Monk, and with their combined love of jazz, they created a very energetic sound with (mostly) upbeat tempos and complicated chord progressions. Because of the prominence of piano in the songs, the band often was often compared with contemporaries Ben Folds Five.  However, as Stewart Mason with Allmusic noted:

"Unlike Folds' strained "look at me" cleverness, ivories-tickling leader Seth Timbs doesn't draw too much attention to himself lyrically, and his cohorts...[were] a much more cohesive and musically capable unit than the Five were."

History
With this line-up, they recorded their first release, Big Notebook for Easy Piano, with producer Ross Rice of Memphis band Human Radio behind the console. Big Notebook for Easy Piano, released in June 1997, garnered dozens of positive reviews from publications such as Alternative Press, Magnet, CMJ, The Tennessean, Nashville Scene, and Billboard, and was eventually nominated for Rock Album of the Year by the Nashville Music Association. After months of continued gigging and building a fan base, the band then recorded their follow-up album, In the New Old-Fashioned Way, in Jackson, Mississippi with producer Richard Dortch. The recording for their second album was done live with minimal overdubs—the opposite approach they had taken with their debut album.

Their following in and around Nashville grew, and the band began touring around the country, especially after scoring a minor radio hit with “Vegetable Kingdom.” In 1999, just before the official release of the second record, drummer Sam Baker left the band and was replaced by Justin Meyer. During this time, the band all shared a house together on Broad Street in Murfreesboro, sandwiched between a car dealership and a gravestone salesman, a fact that many journalists found humorous considering Timbs' fondness for noir themes and dark humor.

In the New Old Fashioned Way was also reviewed very positively in press outlets like Ink19, PopMatters, Nashville Scene, Amplifier, Audiocafe, and Lollipop. This line-up continued gigging, and temporarily based themselves out of Chicago for midwest touring. Eventually, the band began working on songs for the third LP.

Rogers and Morton then left in 1999 around the time the band parted ways with Spongebath Records. They were succeeded by Doug Payne (on guitar) and Jason Dietz (on bass). Meyer moved to Los Angeles in the summer of 2000, and Elliott Currie took his place on the drum throne. This line-up continued working on the third release, called Foreign Legion, which was completed sometime around January 2001.

Trev Wooten took over the bass duties in March 2001, and Sam Baker re-joined the following May as the band prepared to promote the release of the new record. The band was then signed to Cutti Records in Japan and began scoring success overseas. Seth Timbs made several trips to Japan in order to promote the music, and he took the whole band with him in February 2002.

After that, the band essentially broke up as Seth moved to Los Angeles and the other members went on to other projects. Seth recorded the fourth album, The Whole Shebang, with Spike and Mallets drummer Kyle Walsh in hopes of releasing it in Japan. Instead, the album was released nationwide by Murfreesboro-based Vacant Cage Records as Seth returned to Middle Tennessee.  Upon his return, Seth re-formed Fluid Ounces with Brian Rogers back on guitar, Brian G. Pitts on bass, and Kyle Walsh on drums.

Fluid Ounces recorded one more album, Instant Nostalgia, before disbanding in 2008. (Band history borrowed from "Hung On Every Word," a blog about Fluid Ounces at fluidounces.blogspot.com)

Seth Timbs formed a guitar based band called Hot New Singles from 2007-2010.

Seth Timbs now performs and continues to release music under the name The Seth Timbs Thing.

Discography
 Big Notebook for Easy Piano (1997)
 The Vegetable Kingdom EP (1998)
 In the New Old-Fashioned Way (1999)
 Foreign Legion (2002)
 The Whole Shebang (2005)
 Instant Nostalgia (2008)

References
Hung On Every Word: a Blog about Fluid Ounces
Seth Timbs interview
Murfreesboro Post Story on Fl. Oz.
Nashville Scene Mention
A Couple of Questions with Seth Timbs
[ Review of INOFW]
[ Fluid Ounces at Allmusic]
The Whole Shebang Review

Notes

American power pop groups
Musical groups established in 1996
Musical groups disestablished in 2008
Rock music groups from Tennessee
1996 establishments in Tennessee